Trexlertown is an unincorporated community and census-designated place (CDP) in Upper Macungie Township in Lehigh County, Pennsylvania. As of the 2020 census, the population was 2,382. It is part of the Lehigh Valley, which had a population of 861,899 and was the 68th most populous metropolitan area in the U.S. as of the 2020 census, and lies between Breinigsville and Wescosville.

The global corporate headquarters of Air Products is located immediately across the Trexlertown's eastern border with Allentown. Lehigh Valley Velodrome, a velodrome for professional and amateur cycling, also is located next to Trexlertown, in Breinigsville. Trexlertown is also home to one of four Allentown-area Yocco's Hot Dogs restaurants, located at 7150 Hamilton Boulevard.

History
Jeremiah Trexler obtained land adjoining that of his father in Upper Macungie Township, where he kept a tavern as early as in 1732. In 1734 a road was laid out from his tavern through North Wales to Philadelphia. As was the custom of the time, a village grew around the tavern, which came to be known as Trexlertown.

One of the four Yocco's Hot Dogs restaurants, the Lehigh Valley-based fast food establishment known nationally for their hot dogs and cheesesteaks, is located in Trexlertown at 7150 Hamilton Boulevard.

Geography
It is bordered to the southwest by Breinigsville and to the southeast by Lower Macungie Township. U.S. Route 222 forms the northern edge of the community; US 222 leads northeast  to its terminus at Interstate 78 outside of Allentown and southwest  to Reading. Pennsylvania Route 100 forms the western edge of Trexlertown, leading north  to its terminus at PA 309 near Pleasant Corners and south  to Pottstown.

Schaefer Run and Iron Run join in the southwestern part of the community to form Spring Creek, a southwestward-flowing tributary of Little Lehigh Creek and part of the Lehigh River watershed.

Public education
Trexlertown is part of the Parkland School District, and students in grades nine through 12 attend Parkland High School.

References

External links

Census-designated places in Lehigh County, Pennsylvania
Census-designated places in Pennsylvania